Zhangcun may refer to the following locations in China:

Towns 
 Zhangcun, Yushan County (樟村镇), Jiangxi
 Zhangcun, Anji County (章村镇), Zhejiang
Written as "张村镇":
 Zhangcun, Anhui, in Lixin County
 Zhangcun, Dengzhou, Henan
 Zhangcun, Mianchi County, Henan
 Zhangcun, Shandong, in Huancui District, Weihai
 Zhangcun, Pinglu County, Shanxi

Townships 
 Zhangcun Township, Qingtian County (章村乡), Zhejiang
Written as "张村乡"
 Zhangcun Township, Hebei, in Xian County
 Zhangcun Township, Henan, in Huixian
 Zhangcun Township, Jiangxi, in Dexing
 Zhangcun Township, Shanxi, in Qinshui County
 Zhangcun Township, Jiangshan, Zhejiang
 Zhangcun Township, Qingyuan County, Zhejiang

Subdistricts 
 Zhangcun Subdistrict, Xingtai (章村街道), in Qiaoxi District, Xingtai, Hebei
 Zhangcun Subdistrict, Houma, Shanxi (张村街道)